Elizabeth Jane Caulfeild (June 21, 1834 – May 31, 1882 at Roxborough Castle, Moy, County Tyrone, Ireland) was the only daughter of William Meredyth, first Lord Athlumney, and by marriage in December 1856 to James Caulfeild, 3rd Earl of Charlemont, she became the Countess of Charlemont.

Convert to Judaism
Although a Christian by upbringing, Caulfeild converted to Judaism. She became a regular attendant at synagogue worship, often seeking advice in spiritual matters from rabbis. Lady Charlemont resided in the country near Belfast, the synagogue of which town she frequently attended; while in London she worshipped at the services of the Bayswater and Central synagogues. She was a woman of varied accomplishments, an excellent linguist, and a good musician. She possessed a remarkable gift for recitation, which she utilized on behalf of charitable institutions.

References
 

1834 births
1882 deaths
Elizabeth
19th-century converts to Judaism
Jews from Northern Ireland
Jewish philanthropists
Jewish women musicians
Converts to Judaism from Christianity
Irish nobility
19th-century women musicians
19th-century philanthropists
Daughters of barons
Irish countesses
19th-century women philanthropists